Trevor Daniel may refer to:
 Trevor Daniel (American football)
 Trevor Daniel (singer)